Silvino Silvério Marques (23 March 1918 – 1 October 2013) was a Portuguese colonial administrator and a general of the Portuguese Army. He was governor of Cape Verde from 1958 to 1962, and governor of Angola for two terms: from 1962 to 1966, and in 1974.  He was administrator of the National Steel Industry from 1967 to 1970, interim director of Armed Engineers and 2nd Commander of the Military Region of Mozambique from 1971 to January 1973. In May 1974, he was installed by general António de Spínola as governor of Angola, but was removed from office after two months for not giving guarantees to follow instructions from the National Salvation Junta. He was retired into reserve in 1975.

He revived the following decorations:
 Officer of the Military Order of Avis of Portugal (14 January 1954)
 Commander of the Military Order of Avis of Portugal (27 September 1958)
 Grand Officer of the Order of the Colonial Empire (3 November 1963)

See also
List of colonial governors of Cape Verde
List of colonial governors of Angola

References

1918 births
2013 deaths
Colonial heads of Cape Verde
Governors of Portuguese Angola
Portuguese colonial governors and administrators
Portuguese generals